Park Allé (lit. "Park Avenue") is a street in the Indre By district in Aarhus, Denmark which runs north to south from Sønder Allé to Banegårdspladsen. Park Allé is a major bus hub and is home to the Aarhus City Hall, the City Hall Square and the two large hotels of The Mayor Hotel and Hotel Ritz.

History 
The name Park Allé references the former Søndre Kirkegård (South Cemetery) which used to be situated on the area where Park Allé, the City Hall Park and City Hall is located today. In 1920 the city council decided the cemetery should be removed and the area developed into a new neighborhood and park. The city council held an architectural contest to determine the overall design of the area. The contest was won by the architect Axel Høeg-Hansen and city engineer Oscar Jørgensen.

Park Allé was established in the years after 1921 as the first stage of a larger plan. The yellow brick residential buildings along Park Allé was built a short time after with the first building facing Sønder Allé being finished in 1925 and the last being finished in 1932. The cemetery was removed in 1926 and a park was planned for the area instead. The street which was run along the park was named Park Avenue by the City Council in 1925. However, the rapid growth of the city made it necessary to build a new city hall and the area was chosen for it. In 1941, the City Hall was finished and the City Hall Park was established behind it.

Notable buildings 
The largest and most characteristic building on Park Allé is the City Hall from 1941 by designs of the architects Arne Jacobsen and Erik Møller. The city hall is a listed building and a part of the Danish Culture Canon. It is a 5-story marble clad building with a 60 meter tall clock tower.

External links

References

Streets in Aarhus